José Laurel may refer to:
José P. Laurel (1891–1959), President of the Philippines (1943–1945), associate justice of the Supreme Court (1936–1942)
José B. Laurel, Jr. (1912–1998), Speaker of the House of Representatives of the Philippines, Representative of the 3rd District of Batangas, son of José P. Laurel
José S. Laurel III (1914-1998), Ambassador of the Philippines to Japan, son of José P. Laurel
José M. Laurel IV, Representative of the 3rd District of Batangas, son of José B. Laurel Jr.
Jose Laurel Street, in San Miguel, Manila, Philippines